The Bhopal–Singrauli Superfast Express is a Superfast train belonging to West Central Railway zone that runs between  and  in India. It is currently being operated with 22165/22166 train numbers on a weekly basis.

Service

The 22165/Bhopal–Singrauli SF Express has an average speed of 56 km/hr and covers 660 km in 11h 45m. The 22166/Singrauli–Bhopal SF Express has an average speed of 56 km/hr and covers 660 km in 11h 45m.

Route and halts 

The important halts of the train are:

Coach composition

The train has standard ICF rakes with max speed of 110 kmph. The train consists of 17 coaches:

 1 First AC
 1 AC II Tier
 2 AC III Tier
 8 Sleeper coaches
 6 General Unreserved
 2 Seating cum Luggage Rake

Rake sharing

The train shares its rake with 01267/01268 Hazrat Nizamuddin–Singrauli Superfast Express.

Notes

References

External links 

 22165/Bhopal–Singrauli Superfast Express India Rail Info
 22166/Singrauli–Bhopal Superfast Express India Rail Info

Transport in Bhopal
Express trains in India
Rail transport in Madhya Pradesh
Railway services introduced in 2017